The 2002 World Women's Curling Championship (branded as 2002 Ford World Women's Curling Championship for sponsorship reasons) was held April 6-14, 2002 at the Bismarck Civic Center in Bismarck, North Dakota.

Teams

Round-robin standings

Round-robin results
All draw times are listed in Central Time (UTC−05:00).

Draw 1
Saturday, April 6, 7:30 am

Draw 2
Saturday, April 6, 4:30 pm

Draw 3
Sunday, April 7, 9:30 am

Draw 4
Sunday, April 7, 7:00 pm

Draw 5
Monday, April 8, 2:00 pm

Draw 6
Tuesday, April 9, 9:30 am

Draw 7
Tuesday, April 9, 7:00 pm

Draw 8
Wednesday, April 10, 2:00 pm

Draw 9
Tuesday, April 11, 9:30 am

Tiebreakers

Tiebreaker 1
Thursday, April 11, 6:00 pm

Tiebreaker 2
Friday, April 12, 9:30 am

Playoffs

Semifinal 1
Friday, April 12, 2:00 pm

Semifinal 2
Friday, April 12, 7:00 pm

Bronze medal game
Saturday, April 13, 8:30 am

Gold medal game
Saturday, April 13, 1:00 pm

Top 5 player percentages
After Round Robin; minimum 5 games

Notes

References

 

2002
Curling Championship
Bismarck–Mandan
2002 in American women's sports
2002 in sports in North Dakota
Women's curling competitions in the United States
Curling competitions in Bismarck, North Dakota
2002 in women's curling
International sports competitions hosted by the United States
Women's sports in North Dakota